Catholic tradition and Mariology include specific prayers and devotions as acts of reparation for perceived insults and blasphemies against Mary, mother of Jesus, often known as the Blessed Virgin Mary to Catholics. Similar prayers as Acts of Reparation to Jesus Christ and Acts of Reparation to The Holy Trinity also exist.

Some such prayers are provided in the Raccolta Catholic prayer book, first published in association with the Catholic Congregation for Indulgences in 1807.

Additionally, the Five First Saturdays, also called the Act of Reparation to the Immaculate Heart of the Blessed Virgin Mary, is a Catholic devotion which, according to Sister Lúcia of Fátima, was requested by the Virgin Mary herself in an apparition at Pontevedra, Spain, in December 1925. This act of reparation has been approved by the Roman Catholic Church.

In Reparation for Insults Offered to the Blessed Virgin Mary
Words of the prayer from Raccolta:

An Act of Reparation for Blasphemies Against the Blessed Virgin Mary

Words of the prayer from Raccolta:

See also
Acts of Reparation
Acts of Reparation to Jesus Christ
Acts of Reparation to The Holy Trinity
 Mother of God (Roman Catholic)
The Golden Arrow Holy Face Devotion (Prayer)

Notes

References
 Joseph P. Christopher et al., 2003 The Raccolta St Athanasius Press 

Catholic spirituality
Acts of reparation